, better known as  is a Japanese fashion designer who is represented by the talent agency Someday. He is nicknamed . He was divorced and is now single.

Filmography

TV series

Radio series

Advertisements

Newspapers

Magazines

Weekly magazines

References

External links
 Interview 
 Official profile 

Japanese fashion designers
1950 births
Living people
People from Mie Prefecture
Nagoya University alumni